Ahmed bin Khalifa bin Salman Al Khalifa is a Bahraini diplomat from the House of Khalifa, the ruling family of the Kingdom. His father is Khalifa bin Salman bin Ahmed Al Khalifa.

Biography	
Al Khalifa obtained his high school diploma from Sheikh Abdulaziz Bin Mohammed Al-Khalifa Secondary Boys School in 1988, then obtained a degree from the King Fahd University of Petroleum and Minerals College of Industrial Management in 1989. His higher education credentials include a Bachelor’s degree in Computer science and Accounting from the University of Bahrain in 1994, a higher diploma in Executive Management and Strategic Leadership from Columbia Business School at Columbia University in New York City in 1997, and a credit analysis Training Course in London in October 1997.

He was assistant director of customer data analysis at Arab Banking Corporation from 1995 to 1997, then rose to the same post at the Marketing Department from October 1997 to July 1998 and finally to head of the company’s Abu Dhabi office from July 1998 to December 1999. Al Khalifa entered government service a brief turn at the office of the Bahraini Ministry of Foreign Affairs and served as Ambassador to the United Arab Emirates from February 2000 to January 2006. From January 2006 to October 2008, he served as Secretary-General of the Supreme Defense Council with Ministerial rank, earning a promotion to the rank of lieutenant colonel in the Bahrain Defence Force. In August 2009, he was appointed Advisor for Community Affairs with the rank of Minister to Salman, Crown Prince of Bahrain.

References

Ambassadors of Bahrain
House of Khalifa
Bahraini military personnel
Government ministers of Bahrain
Year of birth missing (living people)
Living people